is a former Japanese football player.

Club career
Aoyama was born in Sendai on 3 January 1988. He joined Nagoya Grampus Eight (later Nagoya Grampus) from youth team in 2006. However he could hardly play in the match and he moved to J2 League club Cerezo Osaka in May 2008. He played many matches at Cerezo. He moved to Tokushima Vortis in 2009 and became a regular player. In 2011, he moved to J1 League club Urawa Reds. However he could hardly play in the match and he returned Vortis in 2012. He played many matches and the club was promoted to J1 League end of 2013 season. However his opportunity to play decreased and the club was relegated to J2 League in a season. He retired in July 2015.

National team career
In July 2007, Aoyama was elected Japan U-20 national team for 2007 U-20 World Cup. At this tournament, he played 3 matches as defensive midfielder. He scored a goal for Japan in the 79th minute in Japan's win against Scotland (3–1).

References

External links

1988 births
Living people
Association football people from Miyagi Prefecture
Japanese footballers
Japan youth international footballers
J1 League players
J2 League players
Nagoya Grampus players
Cerezo Osaka players
Tokushima Vortis players
Urawa Red Diamonds players
Association football midfielders